Continuum is a Canadian science fiction television series created by Simon Barry. It was first shown on the Showcase channel on May 27, 2012. It premiered in the U.S on the Syfy channel on January 14, 2013. The series revolves around Kiera Cameron (Rachel Nichols), a CPS "protector" (police officer) from the year 2077 who was transported back to 2012 with a group of terrorists called Liber8 who were scheduled for execution, before their time jump. Kiera must stop Liber8 from changing the past, so she disguises herself as a special agent, and teams up with Carlos Fonnegra (Victor Webster) and Alec Sadler (Erik Knudsen) to stop them. Along the way, she often crosses paths with Matthew Kellog (Stephen Lobo), a former member of Liber8 who has broken off with an agenda of his own.

Showcase announced on December 8, 2014 that Continuum had been renewed for a fourth and final season of six episodes, which began airing September 4, 2015, and concluded on October 9, 2015.

Series overview

Episodes

Season 1 (2012)

Season 2 (2013)

Season 3 (2014)

Season 4 (2015)

References

External links
 
 

Lists of Canadian drama television series episodes
Lists of action television series episodes
Lists of science fiction television series episodes